The End? (also known as The End? L'inferno fuori) is a 2017 Italian zombie horror and thriller film directed by Daniele Misischia and starring Alessandro Roja, Carolina Crescentini, and Claudio Camilli. It was initially released on August 27, 2017 in the UK.

Plot 
One day, Claudio Verona, a young and successful businessman becomes trapped in his office elevator alone. He was on his way to attend an important business meeting with a client. He attempts to call his wife, Lorena on his mobile, and tries speaking through the lift communications to the building maintenance technicians. However, for a very long time, no one seems to come to his assistance. Slowly losing his patience, he pries open the door to the lift but the opening is too narrow and he is unable to get out.

Unknown to Claudio, a deadly and infectious virus has begun to spread in the city. The virus appears to transform regular people into extremely violent and dangerous zombies. Claudio wants to get out of this claustrophobic space, but as the events unfold, he witnesses the effects of the virus. Suddenly, the confined space of the elevator seemed like a safe haven for him. He can only watch helplessly as people that he knows either turn into zombies or get slaughtered by the other zombies roaming the building.

Soon, he finds himself an ally, and together they try to fight their way out of the building to safety.

Cast 

 Alessandro Roja as Claudio Verona
Carolina Crescentini as Lorena (voice)
 Claudio Camilli as Marcello
Euridice Axen as Marta
 Benedetta Cimatti as Silvia
 Bianca Friscelli as Sara
 Roberto Scotto Pagliara as Riccardo
Marco Manetti as Technician (voice)
 Daniele Nisi as Security agent

References

External links 

Review of The End? (2017) on Cineuropa

2017 films
Italian zombie films
Italian thriller films
2017 horror thriller films
2017 horror films
2010s Italian films